Borge is a parish and former municipality in Østfold county, Norway. Today it is located in the northeast part of Fredrikstad municipality, near the border with Sarpsborg.

History
The parish of Borge was established as a municipality January 1, 1838 (see formannskapsdistrikt). The district of Torsnes was separated from Borge as a municipality of its own January 1, 1910. The split left Borge with a population of 6,466. In 1951 a part of Borge with 53 inhabitants was moved to Fredrikstad municipality, and on 1 January 1964 the properties Gansrød and Ulfeng with 30 inhabitants followed the same way whereas the majority of Torsnes was reunited with Borge. After the merger Borge had a population of 9,219. The rest of Borge (together with Kråkerøy, Onsøy and Rolvsøy) was merged with the city of Fredrikstad January 1, 1994. Prior to the merger Borge had a population of 11,959.

Borge Church (Borge Kirke) was built in 1861. It was built of stone and has 270 seats. The church was restored during 1950. The first church  built on the site was dedicated to St. Olav. Churches at this site have burned several times.

The name
The municipality (originally the parish) was named after the farm Borge (Norse Borgar), since the first church was built on its ground. The name is the plural form of borg 'hill fort'. However, the remains of such a fort is not known in the area.

Roald Amundsen, polar explorer, was born in Borge.

References

Other sources

External links
Churches in Norway

1838 establishments in Norway
Populated places established in 1838
Populated places disestablished in 1994
Former municipalities of Norway
Fredrikstad